Kermit Moore (March 11, 1929 – November 11, 2013) was an American conductor, cellist, and composer.

Early life and education 
Of African American heritage, Moore was born in Akron, Ohio.

While still in high school, Moore studied at the Cleveland Institute of Music.

In Manhattan, Mr. Moore studied the cello with Felix Salmond at the Juilliard School while simultaneously studying for a master's degree in composition and musicology at New York University.

Career 
Moore was one of the founders of the Symphony of the New World, the first racially integrated orchestra in the United States. Together with his wife Dorothy Rudd Moore and others, he founded the Society of Black Composers. He was also a member and board member of the Musicians Club of New York.

Personal life 
Moore was married to the composer Dorothy Rudd Moore.

References

External links 
 Kermit Moore on WNYC

1929 births
2013 deaths
20th-century American composers
20th-century American male musicians
20th-century classical composers
African-American classical composers
American classical composers
African-American male classical composers
American male classical composers
Juilliard School alumni
20th-century African-American musicians
21st-century African-American people
20th-century cellists